Benton Middle School may refer to any of the following institutions in the United States:
Benton Middle School, in Benton, Kentucky
Benton Middle School, in Benton, Louisiana
Benton Middle School, in Prince William County, Virginia